The Mombasa Academy is a private coeducational international school situated in the Nyali area of Mombasa, Kenya. It provides education to children aged from two and a half years (Play group) to nineteen years (A2 level). It follows the British National curriculum, with all the subjects being taught in English.

External links

Mombasa Academy

Educational institutions established in 1978
Schools in Mombasa
International schools in Kenya
1978 establishments in Kenya